CricketArchive is a sports website that provides a comprehensive archive of records and data for the game of cricket. It was founded in 2003 by Philip Bailey and Peter Griffiths.

The website contains data corresponding to 1.2 million players, 750,000 scorecards and 14,000 grounds, curated by cricket statistician Philip Bailey.

Over the years, various cricket writers have recognized it as a leading online source for cricket statistics. The Indian Express described it as a haven for obsessive cricket fans. In 2017 it implemented a paywall (previously being free to access).

See also 
 ESPNcricinfo
 Cricbuzz

References 

Cricket websites
Sports databases
Internet properties established in 2003